Haanja Landscape Conservation Area is a nature park situated in Võru County, Estonia.

Its area is 17040 ha.

The protected area was designated in 1957 to protect areas and nature of Haanja Parish (including Suur Munamägi, Vällamägi and Rõuge lakes). In 1979, the protected area was redesigned to the landscape conservation area.

References

Nature reserves in Estonia
Geography of Võru County